Ba'kelalan may refer to:
Ba'kelalan
Ba'kelalan (state constituency), represented in the Sarawak State Legislative Assembly